Sarajevo-Dio Novog Sarajeva is a village in the municipality of Istočno Novo Sarajevo, Republika Srpska.

Demographics 
According to the 2013 census, its population was 84.

References

Villages in Republika Srpska
Populated places in Istočno Novo Sarajevo